Kim Jong-Chun (born July 7, 1976) is a retired South Korean football player, who last played for the amateur side Yongin Citizen F.C. in South Korea.

Kim previously played for Pohang Steelers, Gwangju Sangmu Bulsajo and Jeonbuk Hyundai Motors in the K-League. In 2007, he went to play in Romania alongside fellow South Korean Park Jae-hong for Liga II team, Universitatea Cluj, thus becoming the first foreign footballers in the club's history.

Honours
Universitatea Cluj
Liga II: 2006–07

References

External links

1976 births
Living people
South Korean footballers
South Korean expatriate footballers
Pohang Steelers players
Gimcheon Sangmu FC players
Jeonbuk Hyundai Motors players
FC Universitatea Cluj players
K League 1 players
Liga II players
K3 League players
Expatriate footballers in Romania
South Korean expatriate sportspeople in Romania
Association football defenders